The National Speech and Debate Association (NSDA) is the largest interscholastic speech and debate organization serving middle school and high school students in the United States. It is also the national authority on public speaking and debate.

NSDA was founded by Bruno Ernst Jacob, a Ripon College professor. in 1925 as the National Forensic League. As a college student, Jacob created a pocket handbook, Suggestions for the Debater, which led to the founding of the organization. The name was changed in 2014 to the National Speech and Debate Association.

NSDA provides competitive speech and debate activities, resources, comprehensive training, scholarship opportunities, and advanced recognition to more than 140,000 students and coaches each year.

National Speech and Debate Tournament 
The annual National Speech and Debate Tournament marks the capstone of speech and debate activities for more than 140,000 members across the country. Students must qualify for the National Tournament through their District Tournament. The 2023 National Speech and Debate Tournament will be held in Mesa, Arizona on June 11–16, 2023.

Honor Society 
NSDA's Honor Society, also known as the National Forensic League, recognizes middle school and high school students and coaches for participation in speech and debate activities. Students earn merit points for participation in one of the oldest and most respected honor societies known to college admissions offices.

Members of the Honor Society are held to a Code of Honor, which includes the highest standards of humility, equity, integrity, respect, leadership, and service. The Code of Honor reflects the core values of and standards for participation within the organization.

Events
To create standards for national competition, the National Speech and Debate Association defined a number of speech and debate events that are prevalent in the United States that have been adopted by many states.

Speech
Speech involves a presentation by one or two students that is judged against a similar type of presentation by others in a round of competition. There are two general categories of speech events, public address events and interpretive events.

 Public address events feature a speech written by the student, either in advance or with limited prep, that can answer a question, share a belief, persuade an audience, or educate the listener on a variety of topics.
 Interpretation events center upon a student selecting and performing published material.

Public Address events 
 Commentary (EXC)
 Declamation (DEC)
 Expository (EXP)
 Impromptu (IMP)
 Information Speaking (INF)
 International Extemporaneous Speaking (MX)
 Original Oratory (OO)
 Original Spoken Work Poetry (SW)
 Pro Con Challenge (PCC)
 United States Extemporaneous Speaking (USX)

Interpretation events 
 Dramatic Interpretation (DI)
 Duo Interpretation (DUO)
 Humorous Interpretation (HI)
 Poetry (POE)
 Program Oral Interpretation (POI)
 Prose (PRO)
 Storytelling (STO)

Debate 
Debate involves an individual or a team of students working to effectively convince a judge that their side of a resolution or topic is, as a general principle, more valid. Students in debate come to thoroughly understand both sides of an issue, having researched each extensively, and learn to think critically about every argument that could be made on each side.

Debate events 
 Big Questions (BQ)
 Congressional Debate (House and Senate) (CON)
 Extemporaneous Debate (XDB)
 Lincoln-Douglas Debate (LD)
 Policy Debate (CX)
 Public Forum Debate (PF)
 World Schools Debate (WS)

For a more in-depth explanation of each speech and debate event, NSDA has a competition events guidebook.

Notable Speech and Debate alumni 
Many NSDA alumni have risen to the pinnacle of their respective fields, including:

Authors and film
 Pintip Dunn
 Priya Krishna
 Min Jin Lee
 Jon Lovett
 Celeste Ng
 Roberto Orci
 Bryan Washington

Business and economics
 Austan Goolsbee
 Elinor Ostrom
 James Poterba
 Robert Rubin

Communications and media 
 Kristen Soltis Anderson
 David Begnaud
 Tom Llamas
 Carlos Maza
 Jane Pauley
 Rob Redding

Culinary Arts
 Ann Kim

Education
 Douglas Bernheim
 John Bessler
 Sarah Parcak
 Robert D. Putnam
 John Sexton

Entertainment
 Brian Baumgartner
 Chadwick Boseman
 Nancy Cartwright
 Stephen Colbert
 Chris Colfer
 James Dean
 Joyce DeWitt
 Zac Efron
 Billy Eichner
 Josh Gad
 Ginger Gonzaga
 David Henry Hwang
 Cherry Jones
 Shelley Long
 Idina Menzel
 Jordan Peele
 Kal Penn
 Brad Pitt
 Paul Rudd
 Bruce Springsteen
 Maria Thayer
 Kenan Thompson
 Stephen Tobolowsky
 Michael Urie
 Oprah Winfrey
 BD Wong

Government
 Rebecca Blank
 Yvanna Cancela
 Joaquin Castro
 Frank G. Clement
 William J. Crowe Jr.
 Steve Daines
 Viet Dinh
 Russ Feingold
 Bob Graham
 Janet Reno
 Terri Sewell
 Jake Sullivan
 Elizabeth Warren

Law
 Samuel Alito
 Preet Bharara
 Lisa Blatt
 Stephen Breyer
 Paul Clement
 Thomas Goldstein
 Ketanji Brown Jackson
 Neal Katyal
 Sonia Sotomayor

Technology
 Frances Haugen
 Justin Rosenstein
 Ben Silbermann

See also 
 Competitive debate in the United States

References

External links 
Official website

1925 establishments in Iowa
High school honor societies
Organizations based in Des Moines, Iowa
Organizations established in 1925
Student debating societies